New Tinsukia  is a railway junction station on the Lumding–Dibrugarh section. It is located in Tinsukia district in the Indian state of Assam. It serves Tinsukia and the surrounding areas. It is the second station in the town of Tinsukia after the old Tinsukia Station.

History
The -wide metre-gauge line from Dibrugarh steamer ghat to Makum was opened to passenger traffic on 16 July 1883.

The metre-gauge railway track earlier laid by Assam Bengal Railway from Chittagong to Lumding was extended to Tinsukia on the Dibru–Sadiya line in 1903.

The project for the conversion of the Lumding–Dibrugarh section from metre gauge to  broad gauge was completed by the end of 1997.

Station Amenities
Following services available in New Tinsukia Jn. Railway Station:

  02 (02 Bedded) AC Retiring Rooms with Free Wi-Fi/TV/Locker/Charging point  
  02 (02 Bedded) Non AC Retiring Rooms with Free Wi-Fi/TV/Locker  
  01 (01 Bedded) Non AC Retiring Room with Free Wi-Fi/TV/Locker  
  01 (07 Bedded) Non AC Dormitory with Free Wi-Fi/TV  
  ATM  
  Paid Executive Lounge cum Food Bar
  High Speed  Google Railwire Free Wi-Fi service  
  Upper Class/Lower Class Waiting Rooms having Free Wi-Fi/AC/TV/Charging points/Drinking water & separate Ladies/Gents Washrooms  
  Food Plaza  
  Tea Stall  
  FOB with 2X  Escalator/Elevators  2X
  CCTV Surveillance 
  Cloak Room

References

External links

 

Railway junction stations in Assam
Railway stations in Tinsukia district
Tinsukia railway division
Transport in Tinsukia